The Alakija tanker explosion was a tanker explosion that occurred at Alakija area of Mile 2, a commercial area along Badagry expressway, Lagos State, Nigeria.

Incident
The incident was reported to had occurred on December 1, 2010 when a tanker loaded with liters of gasoline lost control. The content of the tanker spewed on the road leading to an explosion that claimed the lives of about 20 people and leaving several others severely injured.
Four vehicles, including 2 commuter buses filled with more than 24 commuters and 2 private cars, were burnt. 
Taiwo Abayomi, the Area Commander of the Lagos State Traffic Management Authority  confirmed the incident.

See also
Kirikiri tanker explosion

References

Explosions in 2010
History of Lagos State
Tanker explosions
2010 in Nigeria
2010 road incidents
Explosions in Nigeria
December 2010 events in Nigeria
2010 disasters in Nigeria